A theme-based shared flat (called kot-à-projet or KàP in French) is a unique concept created by the University of Louvain (UCLouvain) which consists in between six and twelve students sharing a "kot" (student accommodation) and working together on a project. The project lasts for one (academic) year and can embrace cultural, social or humanitarian activities. There is a total of about 130 KàPs in Belgium gathering more than 1000 students. For example, one of them helps primary school students for their courses, another one takes care of handicapped people and yet another one is organizing sport events in Louvain-la-Neuve. Exchange students are particularly keen to find a place in one of these KàPs because it is an opportunity to integrate the Belgian culture and improve their French. As a result, some of the KàPs have a room reserved for exchange students only.

History 
Theme-based shared flats were created in 1972 in Louvain-la-Neuve in Belgium. This young students city was built after the Flemish, Dutch speaking students chased the French speaking students from the original Catholic University of Louvain in Leuven, present-day Flanders. This situation led to the fact that new forms of social relations and a new innovative culture's conception were created. During its creation, the city included the concept of kot-à-projet which was a perfect way to meet the new objective of socialization. It is the reason why the university directly began to support, to fund the KàPs, and make them attractive for the students in the first year of their creation. At the beginning, these theme-based shared flat were recognized as "student organizations" and were inspired from the community houses (mostly Christian) existing before the Dutch-French separation. In this period the issue of mixing sexes in accommodations occupied an important place. Although it remained officially banned, the university was used to allow the theme-based shared flat's occupants to choose their flatmates. This is why, although the university authorities did not really realize this, the theme-based shared flats were the first mixed accommodation in Louvain-la-Neuve.

Organization 

Most KàPs are not legal associations but those that want can organize a non-profit organization in case they have to manage a significant amount of money. The internal organization is quite distinct because its adapted to the student's lifestyle. Depending on their academic career, students will generally stay in the same theme-based flat for at most two or three years. Each year, this high turnover has to be compensated by finding new people interested in taking the lead of the kap. For this existing members organize dinners to meet newcomers. Furthermore, to stay alive and continue to prove their utility, KàPs must defend their continued working each year to a commission. This commission is composed of UCLouvain officials and students, it examines the whole year covered by the kap, reads the file summary and plans for next year and then decides whether to give the kap an additional year on the campus.

Committee 
All the KàPs are organized round a committee called "the organ". This committee has three main positions:

Chair
The Chairperson is responsible for the KàPs official representations and govern the commission in charge of listening KàPs defense about their renewal.

Treasurer
The treasurer receives subsidies from the university and from the municipality and is responsible for redistributing them to the different KàPs.

External relations
The manager is responsible for coordinating contacts between the KàPs, the University and the City

Categorization of the projects 
The different proposed projects of the KàPs are numerous but they can be categorized:

Benefits
 For the university: developing the social and cultural climate
 For the organizer: discount on the rental fee, rooms and subsidies available to achieve the projects and opportunity to enjoy their life out of the study context. Furthermore, it is a complement to their personal experience (can be useful on a CV)
 For the users: small events organized every week which answer to student's needs.

Specificities of each city
Theme-bases shared flat started in Louvain-la-Neuve but this concept has been expanded to Brussels, Liège, Namur and Mons. In total there are about 130 KàPs in Belgium.

Louvain-la-Neuve 
KàPs were invented in Louvain-la-Neuve and are hosted by the University of Louvain. The city holds over 75 KàPs, with more than 800 residents.

Brussels 
The medical campus of the University of Louvain, UCLouvain Brussels Woluwe, in the Brussels commune of Woluwe-Saint-Lambert, was also founded in the 1970s and started the implementation of KàPs in the Brussels region. UCLouvain holds over 15 KàPs in Brussels.

Saint-Louis University, Brussels also organises kots-à-projet in its three residences in the city of Brussels and on the campus of the Université libre de Bruxelles.

Namur 
As a partner to UCLouvain, the University of Namur has developed 17 KàPs in its city of Namur.

Mons 
KàPs started to develop in Mons in 2011, when the Catholic University of Mons (FUCaM) merged with the University of Louvain, creating the UCLouvain FUCaM Mons with four KàPs, known as 'Kots associatifs', in 2019, and nine in 2022.

Liège 
The city of Liège is still developing the concept, where the University of Liège's student union started developing 4 KàPs, including FRISKOT which tackles food waste.

References

External links
 Inventer les lycées demain

kot-à-projet
kot-à-projet
1972 establishments in Belgium
University projects
Volunteer organizations